La Isla (Spanish for The Island) may refer to:

 La isla (film) or The Island, a 1979 Argentine film
 Isla de Yáquil or La Isla, a town in Chile
 La Isla (Rengo), a village and a former subdelegation in Rengo commune, Chile
 La Isla (wetland), Bogotá, Colombia
 La Isla (Colunga), a civil parish in Asturias, Spain